Liz Kaplow is an American communications executive and entrepreneur  known for her use of storytelling to connect brands with consumers and influencers and her advocacy for the advancement of women in the field. Kaplow is Founder and CEO of Kaplow Communications, an independent public relations firm based in New York City. She has been recognized as leading one of the Top 10 Socially Stellar PR Agencies owned by Women and one of the Holmes Report's Best Agencies to Work For.

Kaplow was elected President of New York Women in Communications in 2013 and serves on the Board of Governors of Cosmetic Executive Women.

She has been quoted in and written articles offering advice to women on career development and leadership, and the importance of cultivating independent thinkers for Ad Age, Mashable, PR Week, NYWICI's Aloud blog, PRNewser and HerCampus.com.

Personal life
Elizabeth Amy Kaplow is the daughter of Irving and Gloria Kaplow. Her father Irving (1916-2005) was president of the Greige goods and commission finishing divisions of Reeves Brothers Inc., a textile and industrial products manufacturer. Her mother, Gloria (born 1927), is an artist and long-time member of The Art Students League of New York.

Kaplow studied English at Vassar College and graduated with honors in May 1981.

In November 1981, Kaplow married long-time friend and Vassar alum Evan B. Jacobs, a lawyer, who serves as CFO of Kaplow. They have two daughters, Juliana and Melanie.

Career
Kaplow began her public relations career in 1981, working for the Human Relations Media Company in Pleasantville, New York.

In 1991 she launched her own agency to focus on the idea of storytelling to create an emotional connection between brands and consumers. At the time, she said, storytelling was not a focus for many in the business, but was the reason for her success with her first clients, like Wolford legwear.

Kaplow also is known for her big event. In 2002, Kaplow and her team created a holiday "pop-up store" for Target on a boat at New York's Chelsea Piers to engage media and consumers in a city where Target had no stores. In 2008, she conceived the Bullseye Bodega to bring Target to New York for Fashion Week.

In 2008, Kaplow launched the Algonquin 3.0 Roundtable, a 21st-century version of the 1920s literary Algonquin Roundtable, and invited leaders in media, technology and entertainment to discuss the future of media in the modern world.

Kaplow added a digital division to her agency in 2008 and opened a studio content creation, production and distribution in 2010.

In 2012, she launched Knext to help start-up companies and emerging brands with communications strategy development.

Philanthropic activities
Kaplow serves as a consultant to CEW's charitable foundation, Cancer and Careers. She mentors Girl Scouts through her position on the Girl Scouts Honor Roll Committee. She also served as a mentor for BlogHer 2013.

Honors and awards
2020 PR Week Hall of Femme Honoree 

2019 Named Honorary Member of Global Women in PR 

2016 Matrix Award Winner 

2012 Beyond Beauty Award, James E. Marshall Foundation

2009 Woman of Distinction, Girls Scouts of America

References

Living people
Year of birth missing (living people)
American women chief executives
American women writers
Businesspeople from New York City
Vassar College alumni
Fashion Institute of Technology alumni
21st-century American women